Philip Hieter (born in 1952) is an American scientist specializing in yeast genetics. He is currently a professor of medical genetics at the Michael Smith Laboratories at the University of British Columbia. He is a member of the National Academy of Sciences.

References

1952 births
Living people
American geneticists
Members of the United States National Academy of Sciences
Academic staff of the University of British Columbia